The Peugeot Type 81 was a fairly large car, and with among the largest units of any contemporary Peugeot model, a correspondingly large production effort of the time.  Available as a closed top limousine or a double phaeton, 251 Type 81s were built during 1906.  The engine was a 2.2 L straight-4 which produced 15 hp at 1400 rpm.

References
Histomobile on Type 81
Peugeot Car Models from 1889 to 1909

Type 81
1900s cars
Vehicles introduced in 1906